Mwashinga may refer to:
 The Safwa people of Mbeya, Tanzania whose chief was called Mwashinga

People
Mwashinga is the surname of:
  Christopher Mwashinga  (born 1965), Tanzanian Adventist author, poet